The Federal Court of Appeal is a Canadian appellate court that hears cases concerning federal matters.

History 
Section 101 of the Constitution Act, 1867 empowers the Parliament of Canada to establish "additional Courts for the better Administration of the Laws of Canada". In 1971, Parliament created the Federal Court of Canada, which consisted of two divisions: the Trial Division (which replaced the Exchequer Court of Canada) and the Appeal Division.

On July 2, 2003, the Courts Administration Service Act split the Federal Court of Canada into two separate courts, with the Federal Court of Appeal succeeding the Appeal Division and the new Federal Court succeeding the Trial Division.

Appellate jurisdiction 
The Federal Court of Appeal hears appeals from the Federal Court and the Tax Court of Canada.

Original jurisdiction 

The Federal Court of Appeal has original jurisdiction over applications for judicial review and appeals in respect of certain federal tribunals.

Salaries 

Salaries are determined annually by the Judicial Compensation and Benefits Commission. As of 2020, the Chief Justice's salary is $344,400 and the other judges, including the supernumerary judges, earn $314,100 annually.

Notable decisions 
In April 2014, the court ruled in favour of the Métis people in a case involving extending protections to Aboriginal peoples in Canada who lived off-reserve.

In September 2015, the court dismissed an appeal by the Government of Canada over a ruling by the Federal Court that found a rule banning the Niqāb at citizenship ceremonies to be unconstitutional.

Appointments

See also

 List of notable Canadian Courts of Appeal cases

References

External links
 
 Federal Courts Act

Canadian appellate courts
Federal Court of Canada
2003 establishments in Canada
Courts and tribunals established in 2003